Zebul may refer to:

 Zebul (biblical figure), the ruler of Shechem under Abimelech in the Bible (Judges 9:28)
 Jephtha's brother in Handel's oratorio Jephtha
 One of the first two judges of Israel according to Pseudo-Philo (written ca. 70 AD)
 The sixth of the seven heavens in Jewish mysticism
The likely original Philistine name for Beelzebub

See also 
 Beelzebub (disambiguation)